The 1995 season was the fourth full year of competitive football (soccer) in Estonia since gaining independence from the Soviet Union on 20 August 1991.

National Leagues

Meistriliiga

Esiliiga

Estonian FA Cup

Semifinals

Final

National Team

Notes

External links
1994–1995 season on RSSSF
RSSSF Historic Results
RSSSF National Team Results
RSSSF Baltic Cup 1995

 
Seasons in Estonian football